The Centro di studi filologici e linguistici siciliani (Center for Sicilian Philological and Linguistic Studies; CSFLS) is a non-profit organization which aims to promote the studies of ancient and modern Sicilian.  Founded in 1951, it has its seat at the University of Palermo and is placed under the patronage of the President of the Sicilian Region and the Rectors of the Sicilian universities.  During its history, the Center has published copious amounts of reference materials regarding the Sicilian language.

See also 
Sicily
Sicilian School
Gallo-Italic of Sicily
Siculo-Arabic
Sicilian vocabulary

References

External links 
 CSFLS
 University of Palermo
 Sicilian Region

Sicilian language
Education in Palermo